Walter Thomas Lastewka, PC (born October 11, 1940) is a Canadian politician. He was a member of the House of Commons of Canada from 1993 to 2006, representing the Ontario riding of St. Catharines as a member of the Liberal Party.

Early life and career
Lastewka was born in Montreal, Quebec and was educated at Ryerson Polytechnical Institute (known at the time as Ryerson Technical Institute) in Toronto, receiving a diploma in 1963. He was hired as an industrial engineer by General Motors in the same year, was promoted to supervisor of industrial engineering in 1967, and held several managerial positions before his retirement in 1992. He completed the three-week-long University of Western Ontario Executive Program in 1981. Lastewka has been involved in several community activities, including serving as a director of the United Way and as a trustee of Brock University. He is also a former director and parish chairman for St. John's Ukrainian Church. In the early 1990s, he was head of the St. Catharines Promotion Task Force.

Political career
Lastewka joined the St. Catharines branch of the Liberal Party in 1972, and worked as campaign manager to federal MP Gilbert Parent in every election between 1974 and 1988. He was vice-president of organization for the Ontario Liberal Party from 1979 to 1981, and chaired provincial campaigns for Jim Bradley and Harry Pelissero. He was elected to parliament in the 1993 election, defeating incumbent Progressive Conservative Ken Atkinson by a significant margin.

He served as parliamentary secretary to the Minister of Industry from 1997 to 1999, and as parliamentary secretary to the Minister of Public Works and Government Services from 2003 to 2006.  Before the 2004 election, he held special responsibility for matters relating to procurement review.

A Hamilton Spectator newspaper report from 1996 described Lastewka as "one of the most hardworking, effective parliamentarians" in office.  He spearheaded a movement to clean up the St. Catharines Twelve Mile Creek during his first term, and used his knowledge of government bureaucracy to expedite the city's bid to host the 1999 World Rowing Championships.  Lastewka supported Paul Martin's bid to succeed Jean Chrétien as Liberal Party leader during the 1990s, and was one of the first Liberal MPs to call for Chrétien's resignation in 2000.  It was reported that a 2002 telephone conversation between Lastewka and Chrétien turned heated, with Lastewka claiming that the Liberal government under Chrétien hadn't "done a damn thing" for Niagara.

In 1995, Lastewka criticized the Government of Canada for attempting to deport Johann Dueck, a constituent who had been accused of committing war crimes during World War II. The government asserted that Dueck was the deputy chief in a police unit that participated in Nazi atrocities and charged him with having obtained Canadian citizenship in 1948 by concealing his past. Dueck denied the charges, saying that he had been conscripted by the Nazis at gunpoint to work as a translator. Lastewka argued that if Dueck was to be charged, it should have been under a 1987 law that allowed accused war criminals to be tried domestically in Canada. Referring to the deportation procedure, he was quoted as saying "I feel very uncomfortable that we have to go back 50 years to correct whatever happened then [...] My heart goes out to them and their family and their friends." He pledged to help the family in any way he could. Lastewka was criticized for these comments by the Toronto Star newspaper and some Canadian Jewish leaders, including Sol Littman of the Simon Wiesenthal Center. The charges against Dueck were dismissed in 1998, when Justice Marc Noel found that the government had not proven he was a war criminal or even a member of the police unit in question. He was not deported, and a subsequent editorial in The Globe and Mail newspaper described him as having been "clearly innocent of the charges."

Also in 1995, Lastewka petitioned the government for an inquiry into the way crown officials handled the prosecution of Karla Homolka. Homolka, a former resident of St. Catharines, was given a twelve-year sentence through a plea-bargain despite having assisted her husband, Paul Bernardo, in the rape and murder of two young girls. Lastewka argued that the sentence was far too lenient and called for a review of the negotiation process.  He later called for Senator Michel Biron to resign in 2005, after Biron wrote a letter opposing restrictions on Homolka following her release.  Lastewka said that he was "appalled" by Biron's letter and wrote that the Senator displayed "complete and utter disregard" for the families of Homolka's victims.  In light of these and other criticisms, Biron offered an apology.

Lastewka holds socially conservative views on some issues.  He voted against Bill C-33 (1996), which amended the Canadian Human Rights Act to include sexual orientation as a prohibited basis for discrimination. He later voted against Bill C38 (2005), which legalized same-sex marriage rights in Canada.  However, he later argued that the Canadian government should accept the legal status of same-sex marriages and not revisit the issue.  Local gay rights activist Ted Mouradian endorsed Lastewka in 2005, arguing that he was a better candidate than his Conservative opponent.

He was narrowly defeated by Conservative Rick Dykstra in the 2006 federal election. The margin of defeat was only 246 votes, one of the smallest in the country.

On March 22, 2007, Lastewka was acclaimed as the Liberal Party candidate for St. Catharines in the next federal election. However, Lastewka was defeated by an increased margin in the 2008 election.

Electoral record

All electoral information is taken from Elections Canada. Italicized expenditures from elections after 1997 refer to submitted totals, and are presented when the final reviewed totals are not available. Expenditures from 1997 refer to submitted totals.

References

External links

1940 births
Canadian people of Ukrainian descent
Liberal Party of Canada MPs
Living people
Members of the House of Commons of Canada from Ontario
Canadian members of the Ukrainian Greek Catholic Church
Politicians from Montreal
Politicians from St. Catharines
21st-century Canadian politicians